The 2007–08 Lithuanian Hockey League season was the 17th season of the Lithuanian Hockey League, the top level of ice hockey in Lithuania. Nine teams participated in the league, and SC Energija won the championship. SC Energija received a bye until the finals, as they played in the Latvian Hockey League.

Regular season

Final 
 SM Poseidonas Elektrenai - SC Energija 3:12

External links
Season on hockeyarchives.ru

Lithuanian Hockey League
Lithuania Hockey League seasons
Lith